is a passenger railway station located in the southern part of Miyamae-ku, Kawasaki, Kanagawa Prefecture, Japan, operated by the private railway company Tokyu Corporation.

Lines

Station layout
The station consists of two island platforms serving four tracks. The platforms are located in a deep cutting in a hill, with the station building located above.

Platforms

History 
Saginuma Station was opened on April 1, 1966. In the spring of 2011, a second ticket gate, on the North side, was added to the station.

Passenger statistics
In fiscal 2019, the station was used by an average of 46,287 passengers daily. 

The passenger figures for previous years are as shown below.

Surrounding area
Saginuma Park
 Miyamae Post Office
Kawasaki City Saginuma Elementary School

See also
 List of railway stations in Japan

References

External links

 

Railway stations in Kanagawa Prefecture
Railway stations in Japan opened in 1966
Railway stations in Kawasaki, Kanagawa